Hans Emil Thimig, pseudonym: Hans Werner (23 July 1900 in Vienna – 17 February 1991, also in Vienna) was an Austrian actor, film director, and stage director.

Life 
The youngest son of the Burgtheater actor Hugo Thimig and Franziska "Fanny" Hummel, his siblings included actors Helene Thimig and Hermann Thimig. He performed without any training as a 16-year-old under the pseudonym "Hans Werner" at the Wiener Volkstheater. From 1918 to 1924 he was engaged – under his real name – at the Burgtheater, and then moved to the Theater in der Josefstadt, managed by his future brother-in-law Max Reinhardt. There, besides his father, his sister Helene Thimig and his brother Hermann Thimig also performed, so that the Viennese public used to call it the "Thimig-Theater". He soon began to direct as well, at first in the Theater in der Josefstadt, and later also in the film industry.

Hans Thimig remained loyal to the Theater in der Josefstadt until 1942. It was also thanks to him that the theatre survived the National Socialist period relatively "Nazi-free". Thimig saw to it that the director of the Deutsches Theater in Berlin, Heinz Hilpert, also took over the running of the Josefstadt Theatre (Reinhardt too had managed both theatres simultaneously). When Max Reinhardt died in American exile in 1943, Hilpert together with the Thimig brothers, despite the Nazi regime, organised a memorial event in the Theater in der Josefstadt.

At the end of 1944 Thimig's superiors ordered him to shoot a politically tendentious film in Berlin. Karl Hartl, the director of production at Wien-Film, advised him however just to "clear off", which he did. He withdrew to the small town of Wildalpen, where the family owned a holiday home, while Hartl covered for him and reported him sick. After the war Thimig became mayor of Wildalpen for a short time, as he was the only man in the place without a National Socialist record.

From 1949 he performed again on stage in Vienna, alternating between the Burgtheater (of which he became an honorary member) the Theater an der Josefstadt and the Wiener Volkstheater. On top of that he continued to work as a film director and in 1959 took over from his sister Helene (who retired on grounds of age) the direction of the prestigious Vienna Max Reinhardt Seminar, as the School of Drama of the Akademie für Musik und darstellende Kunst had been renamed after World War II, in honour of the great Austrian director.

Hans Thimig died in 1991 in Vienna, aged 90. He left his body to science, but a memorial stands in the Vienna Zentralfriedhof.

He was twice married. His daughter Henriette Thimig is also an actress.

Filmography 
Silent films:
1921: Clothes Make the Man - Narr
1922: Der Ausflug in die Seligkeit
1922: The Good for Nothings
1922: Sodom und Gomorrha
1923: Tales of Old Vienna - Wendelin Frohgemut jun.
1924: The Moon of Israel
1925: The Curse - Sinche
1925: Love Story
1927: Die Kirschen in Nachbars Garten / Die Strecke - Kargl jun.
1928: A Woman with Style - Die Ordonnanz
1928: Rich, Young and Beautiful - Paul
1929: The White Paradise - Donald Evans
1930: Was kostet die Liebe?

Sound films:

1930: Money on the Street - Max Kesselberg
1931: Poor as a Church Mouse - Frany, der Barons Sohn
1932: Lumpenkavaliere / Wiener Lumpenkavaliere
1932: Sehnsucht 202 - Ein Beamter
1933: Voices of Spring - Toni
1934: Jede Frau hat ein Geheimnis - Dr.Bürger
1935: Dance Music - Franz Hegner
1936: The Postman from Longjumeau - Pierre Touche, Dorfbarbier
1937: Ich möcht' so gern mit Dir allein sein / Millionäre - Freundlich, Prokurist
1937: Die glücklichste Ehe der Welt - Toni Hubermann
1938: Geld fällt vom Himmel - Christian Pasemann
1941: So gefällst Du mir (co-director)
1941: Brüderlein fein (director; co-wrote the screenplay)
1942: Die kluge Marianne (director; co-wrote the screenplay
1943: Die goldene Fessel (director)
1943: Two Happy People
1944: Umwege zu Dir (director; co-wrote the screenplay)
1944: Wie ein Dieb in der Nacht (director)
1947: Gottes Engel sind überall (director)
1948: Der Angeklagte hat das Wort /Maresi  (director)
1951:  - Bürovorsteher
1952: Voices of Spring (director)
1953: Franz Schubert - Vater Schubert
1954: Wenn Du noch eine Mutter hast / Das Licht der Liebe - Schuldirektor
1954: Victoria in Dover - The Dean Chester
1955: His Daughter is Called Peter - Zimmerkellner
1955: Sarajevo - Rumerskirch
1956: Und wer küßt mich? / Ein Herz und eine Seele - Paul Eckert
1958: Meine schöne Mama - Dr. Meyerhofer
1958: The Priest and the Girl - Legationsrat Düringer
1958: Sebastian Kneipp - Der Kardinal
1959: My Daughter Patricia - Dr. Hartung
1960: The Good Soldier Schweik - Magistrate (uncredited)
1960: Big Request Concert
1960:  Final Accord - Dr. Thimm, Chefarzt
1960: Ich heirate Herrn Direktor
1961: Der Mann im Schatten - Dr. Stallinger, Professor
1965: Der Nachfolger (TV Movie) - Kardinal der Kongregation De Propaganda Fide
1965: Heidi - Dompförtner
1977: The Standard - Hofbeamter

Notes

References 

This article is translated from the equivalent on the German Wikipedia (retrieved 22 November 2007)

 Thimig, Hans (autobiography), 1983. Neugierig wie ich bin. Erinnerungen. Amalthea: Vienna. 
 Kahne, Arthur, 1930. Die Thimigs. Erich Weibezahl: Leipzig.
 Hadamowsky, Franz, 1962. Hugo Thimig erzählt. Böhlau: Graz.
 Ambesser, Gwendolyn von, 2005. Die Ratten betreten das sinkende Schiff. Edition AV: Frankfurt am Main.

External links 
 
  Steffi-line.de: Hans Thimig

1900 births
1991 deaths
Male actors from Vienna
Austrian film directors
Austrian male silent film actors
Austrian male film actors
Austrian male stage actors
Austrian theatre directors
Film people from Vienna
20th-century Austrian male actors